Kevin Daniel Dubini (born 4 March 1993) is an Argentine professional footballer who plays as a forward for JJ Urquiza.

Career
Dubini's career started in 2013 with Primera D Metropolitana's San Miguel. He made thirty-seven appearances and netted three times in his opening two years, prior to making three appearances in the 2015 Primera C Metropolitana; after the club were promoted in the previous year. He left in June 2015 to return to tier five with Atlas. Eight goals in thirty-two games followed. On 30 June 2016, Dubini joined Defensores de Belgrano of Primera B Metropolitana. His debut came on 24 September versus Platense, before his first pro goal in April 2018 against Barracas Central during a season which saw promotion to Primera B Nacional.

Career statistics
.

References

External links

Kevin Dubini on defeweb.com

1993 births
Living people
Footballers from Buenos Aires
Argentine footballers
Association football forwards
Primera D Metropolitana players
Primera C Metropolitana players
Primera B Metropolitana players
Club Atlético San Miguel footballers
Club Atlético Atlas footballers
Defensores de Belgrano footballers
Asociación Social y Deportiva Justo José de Urquiza players